Herstal Group is the parent company of small-arms brands manufacturing companies FN Herstal, U.S. Repeating Arms Company (Winchester) and Browning Arms Company. It is based in Liège, Belgium, with offices in nine other European countries, North America and Asia. It has a corporate partnership with Japanese company, Miroku Co.,Ltd.
Since 1997, Herstal Group has been 100% owned by the Walloon Region of Belgium, who purchased the remaining shares from GIAT.

References

External links 
 
 Report: Profiling the Small Arms Industry - World Policy Institute - Research Project

Belgian companies established in 1889
Firearm manufacturers of Belgium
Manufacturing companies established in 1889
Herstal
Companies based in Liège Province
Government-owned companies of Belgium